Séamus Ó Grianna (17 November 1889 – 27 November 1969; locally known also as Jimí Fheilimí) was an Irish writer, who used the pen name Máire.

Biography
Born to Feidhlimidh Mac Grianna and Máire Eibhlín Néillín Ní Dhomhnaill into a family of poets and storytellers in Ranafast, County Donegal, he attended local primary school until the age of 14. He spent several years at home and as a seasonal worker in Scotland. He attended an Irish language summer college in 1910 and taught for a while for the Gaelic League. He trained formally as a teacher in St. Patrick's College, Dublin, 1912–14, and taught mostly in County Donegal until 1920.

He became involved with political matters and was interned as a republican during the Irish Civil War. He worked subsequently as a translator for An Gúm (a part of the Department of Education), in the Irish Civil Service, and on Irish dictionaries in the Department of Education.

He expressed bitterness with Irish language politics, however, and in 1966 joined the "Language Freedom Movement" along with other Irish language writers and translators such as Maighréad Nic Mhaicín.

His prolific literary output, spanning more than fifty years and including novels, short stories, essays, autobiography, and his famous Rann na Feirste, is a romantic and nostalgic celebration of his native place, its rich oral tradition, poetic speech, colourful characters, local lore, and varied landscape. He was the most influential of the Donegal school of regional writers and the Gaeltacht writer most widely read and imitated by native speakers and learners of Irish during the twentieth century. He was the brother of fellow writer Seosamh Mac Grianna.

Séamus Ó Grianna's novel Caisleáin Óir was developed into a musical and was premiered in An Grianán Theatre, Letterkenny, County Donegal in 2000. It was written by Leslie Long, Kathleen Ruddy and Phil Dalton. It has since had several sell-out runs in County Donegal.

List of works
 Caisleáin Óir. Mercier Press, Dublin 1994 (novel)
 Castar na Daoine ar a Chéile. Scríbhinní Mháire 1. Edited by Nollaig Mac Congáil. Coiscéim, Dublin 2002 (novel and journalism)
 Cith is Dealán. Mercier Press, Dublin and Cork 1994 (short stories)
 Cora Cinniúna 1-2 (two volumes of short stories) An Gúm, Dublin 1993
 Cúl le Muir agus scéalta eile. Oifig an tSoláthair, Dublin 1961 (short stories)
 Na Blianta Corracha. Scríbhinní Mháire 2. Edited by Nollaig Mac Congáil. Coiscéim, Dublin 2003 (journalism)
 Nuair a Bhí Mé Óg. Mercier Press, Dublin and Cork 1986 (autobiography)
 An Sean-Teach. Oifig an tSoláthair, Dublin 1968 (novel)
 Suipín an Iolair, Clóchuallucht Chathail, Tta., Baile Átha Cliath 1962 (novel)
 Tairngreacht Mhiseoige. An Gúm, Dublin 1995 (novel)

References

External links
 Feidhlimidh 'ac Grianna (c1851–1944) of Rannafast, Annaghery, Co Donegal  at Acmhainní Gaedhilge

1889 births
1969 deaths
Irish civil servants
Irish-language writers
Irish male short story writers
Alumni of St Patrick's College, Dublin
People of the Irish Civil War (Anti-Treaty side)
People from County Donegal
Irish male novelists
20th-century Irish novelists
20th-century Irish male writers
20th-century Irish short story writers